The Best of the Lemonheads: The Atlantic Years is a compilation album by alternative rock band The Lemonheads. The American release is considered "criminally brief at 12 tracks"  by one critic, with the international version adding 7 extra tracks.

Track listing

US release 
All songs by Evan Dando unless otherwise stated.

 "Confetti"
 "Rudderless"
 "Into Your Arms" (Robyn St. Clare)
 "It's a Shame About Ray" (Words by Dando, Tom Morgan; music by Dando)
 "Mrs. Robinson" (Paul Simon)
 "My Drug Buddy"
 "It's About Time" (Dando, Morgan)
 "Big Gay Heart" (Dando, Morgan)
 "If I Could Talk I'd Tell You" (Dando, Eugene Kelly)
 "The Great Big No" (Dando, Morgan)
 "It's All True"
 "Ride With Me" (Acoustic)

International release 
All songs by Evan Dando unless otherwise stated.

 "Confetti"
 "Into Your Arms" (Robyn St. Clare)
 "Mrs. Robinson" (Paul Simon)
 "Rudderless"
 "It's a Shame About Ray" (Words by Dando, Tom Morgan; music by Dando)
 "The Great Big No" (Dando, Morgan)
 "Ride With Me"
 "My Drug Buddy"
 "Big Gay Heart" (Dando, Morgan)
 "It's About Time" (Dando, Morgan)
 "The Outdoor Type" (Morgan)
 "It's All True"
 "If I Could Talk I'd Tell You" (Dando, Eugene Kelly)
 "Hospital"
 "Rudy With a Flashlight" (Rainer Ptacek)
 "Into Your Arms" (Acoustic)
 "Down About It"
 "Being Around"
 "Rick James Acoustic Style"

References 

1998 greatest hits albums
The Lemonheads albums
Atlantic Records compilation albums